Money Has Four Legs, is a 2020 Burmese comedy drama film. The film follows the journey of a young director who attempts to complete a feature film in Myanmar, and satirically depicts systemic issues in the country, including corruption and government censorship, and the state of the Burmese film industry.

In the wake of the 2021 Myanmar coup d'état, the film's producer and lead writer, Ma Aeint, was detained by the military junta in June 2021, after becoming a target of the junta for her involvement in this film. She was sentenced to 3 years of hard labour in April 2022.

Cast 

 Khin Khin Hsu
 Okkar Dat Khe
 Ko Thu

Critical reception 
The film was well received by audiences, and was shown at international film festivals, including the 25th Busan International Film Festival, 74th Locarno Film Festival, the 20th New York Asian Film Festival, and the 2021 Vancouver International Film Festival.

References

External links 

 

2020s Burmese-language films
Burmese comedy-drama films
Films shot in Myanmar
2020 comedy-drama films